Souksavanh Tonsacktheva (born August 12, 1988 in Vientiane) is a track and field sprint athlete who competes internationally for Laos.

Tonsacktheva represented Laos at the 2008 Summer Olympics in Beijing. He competed at the 100 metres sprint and placed 8th in his heat without advancing to the second round. He ran the distance in a time of 11.51 seconds.

References

External links
 

1988 births
Living people
People from Vientiane
Laotian male sprinters
Olympic athletes of Laos
Athletes (track and field) at the 2008 Summer Olympics